It Happened in the Donbas is a 1945 Soviet drama film directed by Leonid Lukov based on a screenplay by Sergei Antonov and Mikhail Blajman. Produced by Soyuzdetfilm.

Plot 
The film is about the Soviet youth who fearlessly fight in the years of the Great Patriotic War against the Nazi invaders in the German-occupied Donbas and continue the work of their fathers, who in their time defended the Soviet Union.

Cast
 Tatiana Okunevskaya as Natasha Loginova
 Yelena Tyapkina as Darya Timofeevna
 Vera Altayskaya as Marusya Shelkoplyas
 Yelena Izmailova as Lisa
 Ivan Pelttser as Afanasy Petrovich Kulygin, miner
 Ivan Pereverzev as Stepan Andreyevich Ryabinin
 Mariya Yarotskaya as old woman
 Vladimir Balashov as Pavlik Bazanov
 Sergei Komarov
 Aleksei Konsovsky
 Alexander Mikhailov as member of the YCL
 Boris Poslavsky as Nikolay Sergeyevich Loginov, a doctor
 Heinrich Greif as official labor exchange and the Gestapo
 Vyacheslav Dugin as Anton
 Inna Makarova as partisan
 Yevgeny Morgunov as underground worker
  Mikhail Kuznetsov as underground worker

References

External links

1945 films
Soviet black-and-white films
1940s Russian-language films
Gorky Film Studio films
1940s war drama films
Soviet war drama films
Russian war drama films
Films directed by Leonid Lukov
1945 drama films
Russian black-and-white films
Russian World War II films
Soviet World War II films